"Get Up (Rattle)" is a song by Dutch house DJ and production duo Bingo Players, featuring vocals from American hip hop group Far East Movement.

Background and composition
"Get Up (Rattle)" was released in the Netherlands on 11 December 2012 and released in the United Kingdom on 20 January 2013. It peaked at number twenty four on the Dutch Top 40 and number nineteen on the Single Top 100. It was also a commercial success outside the Netherlands. 
In the United Kingdom, the single entered at the top of the UK Singles Chart, where it remained for two weeks and became both acts' first chart-topping hit in Britain. Elsewhere, "Get Up (Rattle)" peaked within the top ten of the charts in Australia, Denmark, France, the Republic of Ireland and South Korea.

"Get Up (Rattle)" is a revamped and vocal mix version of the Bingo Player's own 2011 song "Rattle".

Music video

Background
A music video to accompany the release of "Get Up (Rattle)" was first released onto YouTube on December 2, 2012 at a total length of two minutes and 59 seconds. The initial video treatment was written by Bingo Players manager, Toby Benson of Complete Control Management.  The video was directed by Tim Hope.

Synopsis

The video was set in the outer city of London, United Kingdom which shows a gang of youths on a run-down estate being set upon by a group of plucky ducks after taking their criminal ways a step too far. A bitter war breaks out between the two sides before the gang move on to mug an old lady who often feeds the ducks. They then toss her bag into the pond before exchanging angry words with one duck, before tossing a stone and killing a duckling. The ducks then seek their revenge and work out a plan to take out the members of the gang. They are seen walking around the estate late at night and one by one they subject each of the youths to a painful death. One boy is seen getting his face pecked off, another is grabbed in the crotch and another is lured out into the road after a duck steals his Blackberry, only to be mown down by a speeding car driven by a second duck, and the last man dies when a duck goes straight through him.

In the uncensored version, the death of the duckling is shown in more detail, the boy who gets his face pecked off has blood splatter on his face and the pecking is much more explicit, the death of the boy who gets run over is shown more graphically, and when the duck goes through the man at the end, the duck is shown with the man's still-beating heart in its beak.

Critical reception
Lewis Corner of Digital Spy gave the song a positive review stating:

While the pounding beat and fizzing synths remain largely untouched on the renamed 'Get Up (Rattle)' [...] they trill with the same old party-til-dawn manifesto, attacking the addictive riffs as brutally as the killer ducks in the accompanying music video. The result is a hasty reminder that change isn't always for the better. .

Track listing

Chart performance
(For distinct chart positions of "Rattle", refer to that page)

Weekly charts

Year-end charts

Certifications

Release history

References

2012 singles
Bingo Players songs
Far East Movement songs
Number-one singles in Scotland
UK Singles Chart number-one singles
Songs written by Maarten Hoogstraten
Songs written by Paul Bäumer (musician)
Hip house songs
Ministry of Sound singles
2012 songs
Spinnin' Records singles